Cut cake, also maren candy (瑪仁糖), maren (麻仁), or qiēgāo, is a confectionery made with candied fruit, corn syrup, flour and nuts. It is a traditional snack of the Uyghur ethnic group in Xinjiang Hotan. Cut cake is made in large blocks, and sold by cutting slices from the block, hence the name "cut cake".

Cut cake bought from Uyghur peddlers has developed a bad reputation because of the practice of cutting slices much larger than requested, followed by insistence on purchase of the entire piece.

In December 2012, the "Sky-high Price Cut Cake Incident" in Yueyang resulted from a local government post on Sina Weibo, describing the government's response to a public brawl involving cut cake peddlers and locals.

Production

Yueyang Sky-high Price Cut Cake Incident
On 3 December 2012 the Yueyang Public Security Bureau posted a report on Sina Weibo about a brawl involving locals and Uyghur peddlers which ended with two people injured and the destruction of peddlers' product.  The post said that one local villager was detained, while the Uyghur peddlers were reimbursed .  The post resulted in a flood of internet commentary resentful of the favouritism shown to minority groups, exemplified by what was considered the exorbitant reimbursement price offered to the peddlers.

References

Chinese desserts
Uyghur cuisine